Troup High School is a public high school located in the city of Troup, Texas, United States and classified as a 3A school by the UIL. It is a part of the Troup Independent School District located in extreme southern Smith County. In 2015, the school was rated "Met Standard" by the Texas Education Agency.

Academics
UIL Science Champions 
1995(2A)

Athletics
The Troup Tigers compete in these sports - 

Volleyball, Cross Country, Football, Basketball, Powerlifting, Golf, Tennis, Track, Baseball & Softball

Notable Football Ed Jasper- College Texas A&M NFL Philadelphia, Atlanta and Oakland

Football Keylon Kincade College SMU NFL Dallas

State Titles
Boys Golf - 3a State Champions 2016-2017 season 
Boys Basketball - 
1992(2A), 1993(2A)
Football - 
1973(1A)

State Finalist
Boys Basketball - 
1956(1A), 1990(2A), 1991(2A), 1994(2A)
Football - 
2004(2A/D2)

References

External links
Troup ISD website

Public high schools in Texas
Schools in Smith County, Texas